The 1987 Major League Baseball All-Star Game was the 58th playing of the midsummer classic between the all-stars of the American League (AL) and National League (NL), the two leagues comprising Major League Baseball. The game was held on July 14, 1987, at the Oakland–Alameda County Coliseum in Oakland, California, the home of the Oakland Athletics of the American League. The game resulted in the National League defeating the American League 2-0 in 13 innings. Montreal Expos outfielder Tim Raines was named the Most Valuable Player.

Rosters
Players in italics have since been inducted into the National Baseball Hall of Fame.

National League

American League

Game

Coaching staff

Umpires

Starting lineups

Game summary

While the previous three All-Star games had had good pitching, the 1987 Midsummer Classic had great pitching. Never before was an All-Star game scoreless after five innings; however, the 1987 game did not see a run until the 13th inning.

After 12 scoreless innings, National League catcher Ozzie Virgil Jr. began the 13th with a single off American League pitcher Jay Howell. Howell would get pitcher Lee Smith to strike out trying to bunt, however, shortstop Hubie Brooks followed with a single, moving Virgil up to second base. Outfielder Willie McGee lined out for the second out of the inning, bringing up outfielder Tim Raines. Raines delivered in the clutch, with a two-run triple, giving the National League a 2-0 lead. Second baseman Juan Samuel lined out, ending the inning. In the bottom of the 13th, Sid Fernandez walked leadoff man Kevin Seitzer, but retired the next three batters in order to give the National League the victory. Due to the length of the game, Lee Smith, a Cubs pitcher at the time, needed to bat. He did not bring his Cubs helmet so he used a Montreal Expos helmet likely from either Tim Wallach or Hubie Brooks.

References

External links
 1987 All-Star Game on Baseball Almanac
 1987 All-Star Game on Baseball-Reference.com

Major League Baseball All-Star Game
Major League Baseball All-Star Game
Baseball competitions in Oakland, California
20th century in Oakland, California
Major League Baseball All Star Game
Major League Baseball All-Star Game